Ruthless is the eleventh solo album released by Bizzy Bone on March 4, 2008.

Track listing
"Intro (Layzie Dedication)"
"That's How" (featuring Pitbull)
"It's 1999"
"Fuck da World"
"Gangsta"
"Get Bizzy"
"Hoodtails" (featuring Rick Ross)
"Ready 4 War"
"Get High"
"Uptown Downtown"
"4 da Ladies"
"Rollercoaster" (featuring Layzie Bone)

Bizzy Bone albums
2008 albums